The Chess Player is a 1938 French historical drama film directed by Jean Dréville and starring Françoise Rosay, Conrad Veidt and Bernard Lancret. It is a remake of the 1927 silent film The Chess Player, itself based on the 1926 novel of the same title by Henry Dupuy-Mazuel. The film takes place in Vilnius  during the reign of Catherine the Great.

It was shot at the Cité Elgé studios in Paris. The film's sets were designed by the art directors Lucien Aguettand and Marcel Magniez. It was released by Compagnie Française Cinématographique in France and Columbia Pictures in the United States

Cast
 Françoise Rosay as Catherine II
 Conrad Veidt as Le baron de Kempelen
 Bernard Lancret as Le prince Serge Oblonsky  
 Micheline Francey as Sonia Vorowska  
 Paul Cambo as Le prince Boleslas Vorowsky  
 Jacques Grétillat as Potemkine
 Jean Témerson as Stanislas, le roi de Pologne
 Edmonde Guy as Wanda Zalewska, la danseuse 
 Gaston Modot as Major Nicolaieff

References

Bibliography 
 Crisp, Colin. Genre, Myth and Convention in the French Cinema, 1929-1939. Indiana University Press, 2002.

External links 
 

1938 films
French historical drama films
1930s historical drama films
1930s French-language films
Films directed by Jean Dréville
Films set in Poland
Films set in the 1770s
Remakes of French films
Sound film remakes of silent films
Cultural depictions of Catherine the Great
Columbia Pictures films
French black-and-white films
Films about chess
1938 drama films
1930s French films